Karanthur is a small town on Wayanad Road (NH 766) near Kunnamangalam, Kerala, India. Karanthur is administered by Kunnamangalam Grama Panchayat. The Punoor puzha, or the Punoor River passes through this locality.

Institutions and centres 
 Markaz
 Markaz Law College
 Markaz Arts and Science College
 Markaz Boys Higher Secondary School
 Markaz English Medium senior secondary school
 Markaz Girls High School
Markaz Unani college

 Navodaya Library and Reading room
Qadiriyya Islamic Center, Snehapuram
Karanthur AMLP School Karanthur
St Aloysius English Medium School, Karanthur

References 

Suburbs of Kozhikode